Ware Lock (No2) is a lock on the River Lee Navigation at Ware. The lock stands adjacent to Ware Weir and is the only lock on the Navigation to be operated and maintained by the Environment Agency.

Public access
The lock stands on the River Lee Navigation towpath which forms part of the Lea Valley Walk.

Unlike most of the locks on the Lea, when travelling upstream, the temporary mooring before entering the lock is on the right-hand (starboard) side of the river, as is the mooring on leaving the lock.

Public transport
Ware railway station

References

External links 
 London canals-Ware Lock
 Ware Lock - a history

Locks in Hertfordshire
Locks of the Lee Navigation
Ware, Hertfordshire